The Historia Scholastica is a twelfth-century Biblical paraphrase written in Medieval Latin by Petrus Comestor. Sometimes called the "Medieval Popular Bible", it draws on the Bible and other sources, including the works of classical scholars and the Fathers of the Church, to present a universal history (universal, that is, from the perspective of medieval Europe).

The Historia Scholastica was a required part of the core curriculum at the University of Paris, Oxford, and other universities, and a significant secondary source of popular biblical knowledge from its completion around 1173 through the fifteenth century, although after about 1350 it was gradually supplanted by newer works.  It was translated into every major Western European vernacular of the period.  Numerous paraphrases and abridgements were produced, in Latin and vernacular languages.

It was among the earliest printed works, with editions appearing c. 1470 in both Strasbourg and Reutlingen.

See also 

 Palaea Historica

References

External links

 Full text of Historia scholastica on Corpus Corporum
 List of medieval manuscripts containing Historia scholastica on MIRABILE

Biblical paraphrases
French chronicles
12th-century Latin books